The Carlos Palanca Memorial Awards for Literature winners in the year 2005 (rank, title of winning entry, name of author):


English division
Novel
 Grand prize: "Salamanca" by Dean Francis Alfar

Short story
 First prize: "The Shakespeare Guy" by Jhon Audrey M.Libot
 Second prize: "Shut Up and Live" by Lakambini A. Sitoy
 Third prize: "At Merienda" by Maryanne Moll

Futuristic Fiction
 First prize: "Treasure Islands" by Karen Manalastas
 Second prize: "Last Bus Ride" by Pia R. Roxas
 Third prize: "Espiritu Santos" by Pearlsha Abubakar

Poetry
 First prize: "What Little I Know of Luminosity" by Joel M. Toledo
 Second prize: "Evasions" by Naya S. Valdellon
 Third prize: "The Proxy Eros" by Ana Maria Katigbak

Short story for children
 First prize: "No Lipstick for Mother" by Grace Dacanay-Chong
 Second prize: "The Dancers of Malumbay" by Raissa Claire U. Rivera
 Third prize: "Menggay’s Magical Chicken" by Nikki Alfar

Essay
 First prize: "From the Outlands with Love" by Lakambini A. Sitoy
 Second prize: "Metaphor Man and Migrant, I" by Aurelio S. Agcaoili
 Third prize: "Thorn" by Maria Angela Nicole S. Perreras

One-act play
 First prize: "First Snow of November" by Alfonso I. Dacanay
 Second prize: "Children of the Sea" by Glenn Sevilla Mas
 Third prize: "Welcome to Intelstar" by Christopher D. Martinez

Full Length Play
 First prize: "In the Land of the Giants" by Glenn Sevilla Mas
 Second prize: "Jyan Ken Pon" by Ma. Clarissa N. Estuar
 Third prize: "Something Happened" by Allan Lopez

Iloko Short story
 First prize: "Goyo: Ti Dangadang iti Rabaw ti Ulep" by Danilo B. Antalan
 Second prize: "Ti Galienera, Ti Ili, ken Tallo A Kronika" by Joel B. Manuel
 Third prize: "Dagiti Dir-i ken Tagay iti Daradara a Bangabanga" by Daniel L. Nesperos

Cebuano Short story
 First prize: "Balyan" by Macario D. Tiu
 Second prize: "Bangka sa Kinabuhi" by Agustin Pagusara Jr.
 Third prize: "Sesyon" by Josua S. Cabrera

Hiligaynon Short story
 First prize: "Turagsoy" by Genevieve L. Asenjo
 Second prize: "Kaupod" by Christian F. Emague
 Third prize: "Daguob Sang Dagat" by Lester Mark P. Carnaje

Kabataan essay
English
 First prize: "Stories" by Patricia Marie I. Ranada
 Second prize: "As Silly As It Gets" by Joan Paula A. Deveraturda
 Third prize: "Learning To Be Filipino" by Katrina G. Gomez

Filipino          .                                                           
 First prize: "Wahahahahahahahaha" by Kristina D.C. Javier
 Second prize: "Alaala ng Quiapo" by Jamaica Jane J. Pascual
 Third prize: "K" by Arnold Pantaleon Pascua II

More winners by year

References
 

2005
Palanca